Sir William Abraham Chatterton, 2nd Baronet (1794–1855) was an Irish baronet.

Chatterton was educated at Trinity College, Dublin. He was succeeded by his brother Sir James Charles Chatterton, 3rd Baronet.

Arms

References

People from County Cork
1794 births
1855 deaths
Baronets in the Baronetage of the United Kingdom